Eastern College may refer to:
Cebu Eastern College in Cebu City, Philippines
Eastern College (Atlantic Canada) in Atlantic Canada, former CompuCollege
Eastern College Australia in Melbourne, Australia
College of the North Atlantic, formerly Eastern College, in Stephenville, Newfoundland and Labrador, Canada
Eastern Goldfields College in Kalgoorlie, Australia
Eastern Arizona College in Thatcher, Arizona, USA
Eastern Gateway Community College in Jefferson County, Ohio
College of Eastern Idaho in Idaho Falls, Idaho
Eastern Iowa Community College District in Clinton, Bettendorf, and Muscatine, Iowa
Eastern Nazarene College in Quincy, Massachusetts
Eastern Oklahoma State College in Wilburton, Oklahoma
Eastern Oregon University in La Grande, Oregon
Eastern Shore Community College in Melfa, Virginia
Eastern University (United States), formerly Eastern College, in St. David's, Pennsylvania
Eastern West Virginia Community and Technical College in Moorefield, West Virginia
Illinois Eastern Community Colleges in Olney, Illinois
Montana State University Billings, formerly Eastern Montana College, in Billings, Montana
University of Baltimore, which absorbed a defunct Eastern College, in Baltimore, Maryland

See also
Eastern University (disambiguation)
Eastern College Athletic Conference
Eastern Colleges Science Conference